Paolo Casarsa (born 2 July 1975) is a male decathlete from Italy.

Biography
He represented his native country at the 2004 Summer Olympics in Athens, Greece. A two-time national champion in the men's decathlon (2002 and 2003) he set his personal best score (8056 points) on 6 June 2004 at a meet in Vienna, Austria. His father Franco Casarsa was a javelin thrower.

Achievements

See also
 Italian all-time lists - Decathlon

External links
 

1975 births
Living people
Italian decathletes
Athletes (track and field) at the 2004 Summer Olympics
Olympic athletes of Italy
Sportspeople from Udine
World Athletics Championships athletes for Italy
Mediterranean Games bronze medalists for Italy
Mediterranean Games medalists in athletics
Athletes (track and field) at the 2001 Mediterranean Games